Panagiotis Nikolakopoulos (Greek: Παναγιώτης Νικολακόπουλος; born August 24, 1994 in Athens, Greece is a Greek professional basketball player who currently plays for Panionios. He is a 6'5" (1.96 m) tall swingman.

Professional career
After playing youth basketball with the junior clubs of Panathinaikos and Koroivos Amaliadas, Nikolakopoulos began his professional career in 2013, with the Greek 2nd Division club Pagrati. In 2014, he joined Ilysiakos. In 2015, he moved to the Greek First Division club Lavrio.

References

External links
Eurobasket.com Profile
Greek League Profile

1994 births
Living people
Greek men's basketball players
Greek Basket League players
Ilysiakos B.C. players
Lavrio B.C. players
Pagrati B.C. players
Panionios B.C. players
Shooting guards
Small forwards
Basketball players from Athens